Nino Borsari (14 December 1911 – 31 March 1996) was an Italian cyclist who won a gold medal in the 4000 metres team pursuit event at the 1932 Summer Olympics.

In 1934, Borsari traveled to Australia  to compete in the Centenary 1000, one-week road bicycle race over seven stages covering . The race was run in as part of the celebrations of the Centenary of Victoria. Paul Chocque a member of the French silver medal team pursuit at the 1932 Summer Olympics also competed. Commenting before the race, Hubert Opperman stated that Bosari "is a mystery. Gay and laughing always, he does not appear to view the contest with any trepidation and, frankly, on his mileage to date, I feel that he will not figure prominently early."  Borsari did not figure in the results of the first two stages, but was 2nd fastest in A Grade in Stage 3, having won the town sprints in Ararat and Ballarat Borsari rode strongly in the arduous sixth stage, extended to 152 miles (245 km) after stage 5 had to be stopped at Mount Buffalo due to a torrential downpour of rain hail and sleet., being crowned "Champion of the Alps" as the first A Grade rider into Omeo, and was 2nd in A Grade at Sale, behind Richard Lamb. Borsari backed up again in the final stage, coming 3rd in the A Grade sprint, and finishing 5th overall.

Along the way, Borsari made a point of selecting the prettiest girl at Warrnambool.

Borsari returned to Italy and rode the 1936 Giro d'Italia, but finished well outside the top places.  He returned to Australia in 1939 and was stranded at the start of World War II.  He was not interned during the war and opened a bicycle shop, Borsari Cycles, in 1942.

In 1948, Borsari assisted in Melbourne's bid for the 1956 Summer Olympic Games. The corner of Lygon Street and Grattan Street in Carlton, Victoria, Australia has been known for decades as Borsari's Corner. A neon sign depicting Borsari on his track bicycle under the Olympic rings marks the corner, over Borsari Ristorante. Next door is the Borsario Building, and one door further down is Borsari Cycles.

Palmarès 

1932
 1932 Los Angeles | Team pursuit
1934
 2nd Milano – Modena, Modena (Emilia-Romagna), Italy 
 3rd Corsa del Commercio, (Milano (a)), Milano (Lombardia), Italy 
Centenary 1000
2nd in A Grade Stage 3 
Champion of the Alps – Mt Buffalo to Omeo
4th and 2nd fastest Stage 6
3rd in A Grade stage 7
5th Overall in championship
1935
1st Piacenza (a), Piacenza (Emilia-Romagna), Italy 
1936
 Giro d'Italia

References

External links 

1911 births
1996 deaths
Italian male cyclists
Olympic cyclists of Italy
Cyclists at the 1932 Summer Olympics
Olympic gold medalists for Italy
Olympic medalists in cycling
Sportspeople from the Province of Modena
Medalists at the 1932 Summer Olympics
Italian emigrants to Australia
Italian track cyclists
Cyclists from Emilia-Romagna